Slender threeseed mercury is a common name for several plants and may refer to:

Acalypha gracilens
Acalypha monococca